Gvozdyovka is a rural locality (a selo) in Russko-Gvozdyovskoye Rural Settlement, Ramonsky District, Voronezh Oblast, Russia. The population was 103 as of 2010. There are 6 streets.

Geography 
Gvozdyovka is located 28 km southwest of Ramon (the district's administrative centre) by road. Russkaya Gvozdyovka is the nearest rural locality.

References 

Rural localities in Ramonsky District